Graeme Leslie Stephens  is director of the center for climate sciences at the NASA Jet Propulsion Laboratory at the California Institute of Technology and professor of earth observation the University of Reading.

Education
Stephens was educated at the University of Melbourne in Australia where he received a Bachelor of Science degree in Physics 1973 in followed by a PhD in meteorology in 1977.

Career and research
Stephens research has provided leadership in three major disciplinary areas of Earth sciences:
 Atmospheric radiation and radiative transfer
 Earth observations and remote sensing
 Understanding critical cloud-climate feedbacks and related effects on the Earth's energy budget

Stephens has pioneered quantitative uses of global Earth observations and combined this with theory to study Earth's climate change feedback. He provided leadership in designing and developing international satellite programs exemplified by his creation and leadership of the decade long CloudSat satellite mission that is providing novel insights and understanding of the Earth's clouds, precipitation and their role in climate.

Awards and honours
Stephens was elected a member of the National Academy of Engineering of the United States in 2015, received the Jule G. Charney Award of the American Meteorological Society for pioneering advances in understanding and measuring radiation processes and their role in climate, and received the Gold Medal of the International Radiation Commission in recognition of world leading contributions to the radiation community. He also received National Aeronautics Space Administration, Exceptional Public Service Medal.

He was elected a Fellow of the Royal Society in 2018.

References

Living people
Australian climatologists
Australian meteorologists
Fellows of the Royal Society
Year of birth missing (living people)